McGinnis Mountain, also known as Mount McGinnis, is a  mountain summit located in the Boundary Ranges, in the U.S. state of Alaska. Although modest in elevation, relief is significant since the mountain rises up from sea level at Auke Bay in less than five miles. McGinnis Mountain is often seen and photographed with Stroller White Mountain, a  summit  to the north because they are together in the background behind Mendenhall Lake, a popular tourist and recreation area.

History

The mountain's name was officially adopted in 1930 by the United States Geological Survey McGinnis Mountain takes its name from McGinnis Creek, which drains its northern slopes. McGinnis Creek in turn was originally named McInnis River in 1891 by John McInnis and Edward Brennan who had staked claims in the area. In 1903, the name was reported as McGinnis Creek by the USGS.

Climate

Based on the Köppen climate classification, McGinnis Mountain is located in a subarctic climate zone with cold, snowy winters, and mild summers. Temperatures can drop below −20 °C with wind chill factors below −30 °C. This climate supports the Mendenhall Glacier and Juneau Icefield to the mountain's east. May and June are the best months for climbing in terms of catching favorable weather.

See also

List of mountain peaks of Alaska
Geography of Alaska
Bullard Mountain

References

Gallery

External links
 Weather forecast: McGinnis Mountain

Mountains of Alaska
Mountains of Juneau, Alaska
Boundary Ranges
North American 1000 m summits